Jillian Pauline Saulnier (born March 7, 1992) grew up in Halifax, Nova Scotia, Canada.  She was the first female ice hockey player to represent Nova Scotia at the IIHF Women’s World Championship in 2015. She is a two-time Olympian for Team Canada, winning a gold medal in 2022 and a silver medal in 2018.  She is a member of Hockey Canada's National Women's Team, which won Gold in 2021 and plays in the PWPHL in Montreal. She did play in CWHL's Les Canadiennes de Montréal before the organization folded in the Spring of 2019.  Jill was also a part of Canada's National Women's Under-18 Team which won gold at the 2010 IIHF World Women's Under-18 Championship in Chicago.  As a member of the gold-winning squads and accomplishments throughout her career, Jill made history again in 2021 when Tim Horton's annual Trading Hockey Card collection included 15 women (stars) from Canada's national women's team.  She also was featured in the Upper Deck 2010 World of Sports card series. In addition, she participated in the Canada Celebrates Event on June 30 in Edmonton, Alberta which recognized the Canadian Olympic and World hockey champions from the 2009–10 season. She made her debut with the Canada women's national ice hockey team at the 2014 4 Nations Cup.

Playing career
Saulnier has competed in five Atlantic Challenge Cups. Saulnier has claimed three gold (2003, 2005, 2007) and two silver medals (2006, 2008). She won a gold medal at Nova Scotia provincials with the Halifax Hawks in 2006. Saulnier captained the Halifax Hawks the following season and was named team MVP. She played for Nova Scotia at the 2007 Esso Women's Nationals and was part of the fourth-place team.

At the 2007 National Women's Under-18 Championships, she played for Team Atlantic and finished in fourth. In 2008, Saulnier captained Team Atlantic at the 2008 National Women's Under-18 Championships. The team finished in eighth place, but Saulnier was honoured with the Most Sportsmanlike Player award.

She played for Team Atlantic again at the 2009 National Women's Under-18 Championships and finished in sixth place. That year, Saulnier also played with the Stoney Creek Junior Sabres in Ontario and claimed a silver medal at the OWHA provincials. Two of her teammates on the Stoney Creek Junior Sabres, Laura Fortino and Jessica Wong, would play with her at the 2009 IIHF World Women's Under-18 Championships in Germany and win a silver medal.

She finished fourth in scoring with the Toronto Jr. Aeros of the PWHL in 2009–10. At the PWHL championships, she won a silver medal with Toronto. In 2010, Saulnier won a gold medal with Toronto at the OWHA provincials.

NCAA
In February 2011, she committed to join the Cornell Big Red of the ECAC. In her first three career NCAA games, she registered ten points (seven goals, three assists), along with a +6 rating. In her college debut versus the Colgate Raiders women's ice hockey program on October 25, Saulnier netted four goals. Her four-goal night was the first for Cornell since Jessica Campbell scored four against Robert Morris in the second game of the 2010–11 season. She scored her first career goal when she was out on the Big Red's first power play of the game. In her next game versus the Yale Bulldogs, she registered one goal and two assists while scoring two goals in her third game versus the Brown Bears women's ice hockey squad. For the month of October 2011, she was tied for first in the ECAC in goals scored (while the other player appeared in eight games). In a game on November 1, 2011, the Cornell Big Red scored at least nine goals in one game for the third consecutive contest. It was senior captain Chelsea Karpenko's 100th career game, as Saulnier led all Big Red players with two goals and three assists in a 9–2 triumph over the Syracuse Orange women's ice hockey program.

Hockey Canada
In August 2008, Saulnier was a member of Canada's National Women's Under-18 Team, competing in a three-game series against the United States in Lake Placid. The following year, Saulnier was a member of Canada's National Women's Under-18 Team that competed in a three-game series against the United States in Calgary. Also, in 2009, she won a silver medal with Canada's National Women's Under-18 Team at the 2009 IIHF World Women's Under-18 Championships. In a March 24, 2010, contest versus the OWHA All-Stars, Saulnier played for the Canadian National Under 18 Women's Team. Saulnier would register an assist in the contest as the OWHA All-Stars defeated the Under 18 team by a 3–2 tally. In April 2010 she won a gold medal with Canada's National Women's Under-18 Team at the 2010 IIHF World Women's Under-18 Championships in Chicago, beating Team USA in OT.

She played for Canada's National Women's Under-22 Team in a three-game series vs. the United States in Toronto in August 2010. Saulnier was an assistant captain at the 2010 IIHF Under 18 Women's World Championships. She finished fourth in tournament scoring with four goals and six assists in five games.

On January 11, 2022, Saulnier was named to Canada's 2022 Olympic team. The team won the gold medal, defeating the United States in the final 3-2.

CWHL
Saulnier scored a goal as a member of Team Black in the 2nd Canadian Women's Hockey League All-Star Game.

Appearing with the Calgary Inferno in the 2016 Clarkson Cup finals, Saulnier registered an assist as the Inferno emerged victorious in a convincing 8–3 final.

At the 3rd CWHL All-Star Game, Saulnier and Jess Jones both scored a hat trick, becoming the first competitors in CWHL All-Star Game history to achieve the feat.

On July 12, 2018, Saulnier and teammate Genevieve Lacasse were traded by the Inferno to the Canadiennes de Montreal in exchange for future considerations in the form of player(s) and/or draft pick(s).

Personal life
Saulnier is a member of LGBTQ community.

Career stats

Hockey Canada

NCAA

Awards and honours

Cornell
2012 Recipient, Cornell Class of '14 Rookie of the Year Award
Quill and Dagger Senior Honor Society

NCAA
ECAC Rookie of the Week (Week of October 31, 2011)
ECAC Rookie of the Week (Week of November 7, 2011)
ECAC Rookie of the Month (Month of October 2011)
ECAC Rookie of the Month (Month of November 2011)

References

External links
 
 
 
 
 
 

1992 births
Living people
Calgary Inferno players
Canadian expatriate ice hockey players in the United States
Canadian women's ice hockey forwards
Clarkson Cup champions
Cornell Big Red women's ice hockey players
Ice hockey people from Nova Scotia
Ice hockey players at the 2018 Winter Olympics
Ice hockey players at the 2022 Winter Olympics
Les Canadiennes de Montreal players
Medalists at the 2018 Winter Olympics
Medalists at the 2022 Winter Olympics
Olympic ice hockey players of Canada
Olympic medalists in ice hockey
Olympic gold medalists for Canada
Olympic silver medalists for Canada
Sportspeople from Halifax, Nova Scotia
Professional Women's Hockey Players Association players
Canadian LGBT sportspeople
Lesbian sportswomen
LGBT ice hockey players